The 2008 Denmark Super Series is the ninth tournament of the 2008 BWF Super Series in badminton. It was held in Odense, Denmark from October 21 to October 26, 2008.

Final Results

External links
Denmark Open Super Series 2008 at tournamentsoftware.com

Denmark Open
B
Denmark
Odense Municipality